Benjamin Franklin, Self-Revealed is a biography of Benjamin Franklin written by William Cabell Bruce in 1917.  A "biographical and critical study based mostly on Benjamin Franklin's own writings", the book won the Pulitzer Prize for Biography or Autobiography in 1918.

See also
 The Autobiography of Benjamin Franklin

References

External links

1917 non-fiction books
American biographies
Pulitzer Prize for Biography or Autobiography-winning works
Books about Benjamin Franklin